In Greek mythology, Polemusa (Ancient Greek: Πολεμοῦσά means 'make hostile, make an enemy of') was one of the Amazons, a race of warrior-women. She came with their queen, Penthesilia to the Trojan War. Polemusa was killed by the hero Achilles during the siege of Troy.

Notes

References 

 Quintus Smyrnaeus, The Fall of Troy translated by Way. A. S. Loeb Classical Library Volume 19. London: William Heinemann, 1913. Online version at theio.com
 Quintus Smyrnaeus, The Fall of Troy. Arthur S. Way. London: William Heinemann; New York: G.P. Putnam's Sons. 1913. Greek text available at the Perseus Digital Library.

Amazons (Greek mythology)